Merostachys is a Neotropical genus of bamboo in the grass family. It is found in South America and Central America from Belize to Paraguay.

Species

Formerly included
see Athroostachys Rhipidocladum 
 Merostachys capitata - Athroostachys capitata
 Merostachys racemiflora - Rhipidocladum racemiflorum

References

Bambusoideae genera
Grasses of North America
Grasses of South America
Flora of Central America
Grasses of Brazil
Grasses of Mexico
Bambusoideae